Coleophora schahkuhensis is a moth of the family Coleophoridae. It is found in Iran.

References

schahkuhensis
Moths of the Middle East
Moths described in 1952